Pablo Motos Burgos (born August 31, 1965) is a Spanish comedian and broadcaster who is best known for producing and presenting El Hormiguero, a popular Spanish television show.

Biography
He was the son of Amelia Burgos, who died on 11 December 2018. He did his military service in Ceuta, where he also worked as a receptionist in a military residence.

Career

Radio 
Pablo Motos media began his career as a radio host. He later worked at Radio Nacional in Utiel, then Onda Cero Valencia, where he presented and directed programs like Aquí hay más de uno, Mareando la perdiz or Hacia el dos mil, where he has been part of the team as a contributor of La Radio de Julia Otero.

Between September 2002 and June 22 in 2007, introduced the program We are no one on M80 Radio in the mornings from Monday to Friday, filling the gap left by the program Gomaespuma with great success. Stopped doing the program with his team to devote full-time to El Hormiguero, performed Monday through Thursday.

Television 

On television he has presented Megacine Canal Nou (Valencian television) and was one of the creators of The Comedy Club. Coordinated the scripts of the first three years. At that time created The Night... with Fuentes and Co. of which he was script coordinator and executive producer.

Since September 2006, he presented and directed El Hormiguero in the general channel Cuatro. During its first year it was a weekly program that aired on Sunday evening and from September 2007 it airs Monday through Thursday and Saturday night. From approximately 21:30 to 22:30.

In 2007 he presented the traditional New Year's Eve show in Cuatro together with his fellow ants Trancas and Barrancas.

He also participated in the inauguration of the soccer Euro Cup 2008 in Cuatro.

Theatre 
On stage he has been director of scripts and one of the authors of Five mujeres.com Five hombres.com, and Life of St. Francis. Also contributed to the Spanish version directed by Verónica Forqué of The Seven Year Itch. Also starred with Enrique San Francisco between strong and weak.

Advertising 
Pablo Motos has also made forays into the world of advertising. Binaca made an announcement referring to a bad mouth, has been the voice of Coca-Cola, announced the bank credit card Visa and released the air conditioning Fujitsu. In March 2010, gives voice to the announcement of McDonald's.

Production
In 2006, he created his own production company, 7yAcción together with the producer Jorge Salvador in 2007 to produce El Hormiguero for Cuatro. In 2008 he created War of Brains for Telecinco and in 2010 he created Tonterias las Justas for Cuatro.

In 2021 he created the game show El desafío for Antena 3.

Film 
Pablo Motos dubbed the voice of a doll that was stuck in a car for the Spanish version of Toy Story 3. He made an appearance in the film Torrente 4: Lethal Crisis, and Torrente 5: Operación Eurovegas directed by fellow Santiago Segura.

Worst Comedian 
According to the magazine FHM, through a number of online Internet voting, Pablo Motos was considered the worst comedian on the national scene in 2011.

Controversies 
Motos and El Hormiguero have been criticised as misogynist for his and the show's treatment of and comments regarding women. In 2022, the Ministry of Justice published a campaign against violence against women titled #EntoncesQuien ("Then Who"), with a spoof of El Hormiguero and the presenter - a parody of Motos - asking a female guest "And talking of the changing rooms, when you're sleeping, do you wear sexy or comfortable underwear?" The lady says, breaking the fourth wall, "If I were a guy, he wouldn't have asked me that question." Motos rejected this, on the show criticising that €1 million of public money had been spent on the campaign.

Awards

References

External links
 
 

1965 births
Living people
Spanish television presenters
Spanish comedians
Spanish stand-up comedians